Maxim Sergeyevich Sushko (born 10 February 1999) is a Belarusian professional ice hockey forward who is currently playing for HC Sibir Novosibirsk of the Kontinental Hockey League (KHL). Sushko was selected by the Philadelphia Flyers in the fourth round, 107th overall, of the 2017 NHL Entry Draft. Internationally he has played for the Belarusian national team at both the junior and senior level.

Playing career 
With the 2020–21 NHL season to be delayed due to the COVID-19 pandemic, on 17 July 2020 Sushko opted to return to Belarus and sign with the country's highest ranked professional team, HC Dinamo Minsk of the Kontinental Hockey League on loan from the Flyers, and play until the resumption of the North American season. In 30 contests with Minsk, Sushko added 2 goals and 5 points before returning to the Flyers organization.

On 18 February 2021 Sushko made his NHL debut with the Flyers against the New York Rangers due to multiple COVID-19 related absences on the main roster.

Following the conclusion of the  season with the Flyers, Sushko as an impending restricted free agent opted to halt his NHL career after his KHL rights were dealt from Dinamo Minsk to HC Dynamo Moscow on 20 May 2022. He was immediately signed to a two-year contract with Dynamo to begin in the 2022–23 season. Sushko collected 8 points through 27 regular season games before he was traded by Dynamo Moscow to Sibir Novosibirsk on 16 December 2022.

Career statistics

Regular season and playoffs

International

References

External links

 

1999 births
Living people
Belarusian ice hockey forwards
HC Dinamo Minsk players
HC Dynamo Moscow players
Lehigh Valley Phantoms players
Owen Sound Attack players
Sportspeople from Brest, Belarus
Philadelphia Flyers draft picks
Philadelphia Flyers players
HC Sibir Novosibirsk players